Deer/Mount Judea School District  is a public school district in Newton County, Arkansas, United States.

The school district formed on July 1, 2004, resulting from consolidation of two former school districts based in Deer (Deer School District) and Mount Judea.

Circa 2006 the district received $509,000 in extra state funding due to the rural isolation in the district.

A 2010 report by the University of Arkansas Office for Educational Policy stated that the district had the possibility of its enrollment going below 350 students within five years. This could have possibly forced another consolidation.

Schools 
Elementary education:
 Deer Elementary School, serving prekindergarten through grade 6.
 Mount Judea Elementary School, serving prekindergarten through grade 6.

Secondary education:
 Deer High School, serving grades 7 through 12.
 Mount Judea High School, serving grades 7 through 12.

References

Further reading
These include maps of predecessor districts:
 2004-2005 School District Map
 Map of Arkansas School Districts pre-July 1, 2004
 (Download)

External links
 

2004 establishments in Arkansas
Education in Newton County, Arkansas
School districts in Arkansas
School districts established in 2004